Vice Admiral Konstantinos Karageorgis (born February 23, 1962) is a Greek naval officer, currently serving as Chief of the Fleet Command.

He joined the Navy in 1979 and qualified as a weapons officer.

He served as Commander of the Fast Patrol Boats Command, Deputy Commander of the Hellenic Naval Academy and Commander of the Logistic Support Command as well as of the Naval Training Command.

He was appointed Commander in Chief of the Hellenic Fleet in 2015.

References

1962 births
Hellenic Navy admirals
Living people
Military personnel from Athens